Amogh Sunil Desai (born 26 August 1992) is an Indian cricketer who plays for Goa.

References

External links
 

1992 births
Living people
Indian cricketers
Goa cricketers
Cricketers from Mumbai